Peter Dedevbo is a soccer coach who is currently the head coach of the Nigerian U20- Women's National team. In 2014, he led the Nigerian women U20 squad to final of the U20 worldcup in Canada.

Managerial career

U20 national team
In 2013, The Nigerian Football Federation named Dedevbo as the head coach of the Nigerian U20 Women's National team. He was reappointed head coach in 2015 after his team reached the U20 women's worldcup.

Personal life
Dedevbo is married with two children to Rume Jibromah Dedevbo. In 2014, he was named the Nigerian Coach of the year at the Nigerian Sports Awards.

References 

Nigerian football managers
Living people
1970 births